Swami Gambhirananda (1899–1988), born as Jatindranath Datta, was a Hindu sanyasi associated with Ramakrishna Mission. He was born at Sadhuhati in today's Bangladesh. He graduated from Scottish Church College, Calcutta (Kolkata).

Jatindranath Datta was influenced by his teacher Swami Jagadananda.

He joined the Ramakrishna Mission in May, 1923. He was initiated to Sannyasa by Swami Shivananda (a direct disciple of Sri Ramakrishna) in 1928. Due to his excellent work, he was made the Secretary of Ramakrishna Mission Vidyapith, Deoghar in the year 1926 and continued till 1935. He was excellent in Sanskrit Language, he studied Sanskrit while he was staying in Varanasi Advaita Ashrama. From 1953-1963, he served as the President of Advaita Ashrama, Mayavati. He became Vice President of the Order in 1979 and he was elected as the President in 1985 and remained as President until his death in 1988 and at that time he initiated many. He died on 27 December 1988, at evening 7:27 PM at Ramakrishna Mission Seva Pratishthan from Severe lung-infection and Cardiac problems. A scholar, he was the 11th President of the Ramakrishna Mission. He translated 10 Major Upanishads with Adi Shankaracharya's Commentary from Sanskrit to English, word by word. He also translated Shankaracharya's Sanskrit Commentary on Bhagavad Gita to English, word by word and Madhusudana Saraswati's Commentary on Gita (known as Gudartha Dipika) from Sanskrit to English, Adi Shankaracharya's Masterpiece Brahma Sutra Bhasya from Sanskrit to English, and numerous other works related to Vedanta and Ramakrishna-Vivekananda literature. Swami Gambhirananda also met several other disciples of Ramakrishna, including Swami Saradananda, Swami Abhedananda, Swami Subodhananda, Swami Akhandananda, Swami Vijnanananda, Mahendranath Gupta (Sri M).

Character 
He was very quiet and serious person and was extremely punctual, as reported by those who stayed with him or saw him. His name, "Gambhir" means serious, deep and profound.

Works 
Advaita Ashram
The apostles of Shri Ramakrishna (compiler, editor), Advaita Ashrama, 2nd ed. 1972

References

Presidents of the Ramakrishna Order
1889 births
1988 deaths
Khulna District
Scottish Church College alumni
University of Calcutta alumni
Indian religious writers
Monks of the Ramakrishna Mission
Scholars from Kolkata